Allie Creek is a stream in northeastern Bollinger and northwestern Cape Girardeau counties of southeast Missouri.

Allie Creek most likely has the name of the female relative of a pioneer settler.

See also
List of rivers of Missouri

References

Rivers of Bollinger County, Missouri
Rivers of Cape Girardeau County, Missouri
Rivers of Missouri